Vadym Dovhanyuk (. Also known as Vadym Dovganyuk; born January 15, 1987)  is an 11 times world champion  powerlifter and  World Games 2013 champion. He holds 36 unbeaten records in powerlifting and bench press. His personal records are squat – 410 kg, bench press – 335.5 kg, deadlift – 325 kg and total 1050.5 kg.

Biography
Dovhanyuk Vadym Volodymyrovych was born on January 15, 1987, in city Volochysk, Khmelnytskyi Oblast, Ukraine. In 2004 he graduated from the Volochisk School No.5. In 2011 he graduated from Kamyanets-Podilsky Ivan Ohienko National University by speciality Physical culture and Sport.

Vadym started powerlifting in 15 years in the small gym owned Volochisk Machine-Building Plant "Motor Sich". Through "Motor Sich" Vadym in 2004 went to the first World Cup held in Pretoria, South Africa for the first time and became world champion. After these events were 10 world championships where Vadym stood on the highest step of the base (pedestal).

At the age of 17 fulfilled standard of master of sports of Ukraine. At 19 fulfilled standard of master of sports of Ukraine of international class. 
In 2011, he was in the main part of the national team of Ukraine.  In 2012 at the World Championships in Puerto Rico received a license to participate in the most qualified powerlifting competitions (World Games) held in Colombia in 2013, where Vadym became champion and set two world records in bench press. After the victory in 2013 received the highest title of Honored Master of Sports and National Award — Order of Merit III class.

Personal life
In 2008 married to Inna Mykolaevna Dovhaniuk. In 2009, a son Ivan was born.

Awards
 Order of Merit Third Class (14 September 2013)
 World champion among youth of 2004, 2006, 2007 — World Sub Juniors Champion  
 Junior 2009, 2010 – World Juniors Champion
 among adults by 2013, 2014, 2015 – Worlds Open Champion
 33 existing world records. 
 Champion of the World Games in Colombia in 2013.

See also
 List of world championships medalists in powerlifting (men)
 Powerlifting at the World Games

References

External links 
 Vadym Dovhanyuk profile at goodlift.info

Ukrainian powerlifters
1987 births
Living people
People from Volochysk
World Games gold medalists
Male powerlifters
Competitors at the 2013 World Games
Sportspeople from Khmelnytskyi Oblast